Denzinger may refer to:

 Heinrich Joseph Dominicus Denzinger
 Enchiridion symbolorum, definitionum et declarationum de rebus fidei et morum, a compilation of Catholic documents referred to as the Denzinger after its first editor, Heinrich Joseph Dominicus Denzinger

German-language surnames